George Bryan (1731–1791) was a Pennsylvania businessman, statesman and politician of the Revolutionary era.

George Bryan may also refer to:
George Bryan (actor) (fl. 1586–1613), actor in English Renaissance theatre
George Seabrook Bryan (1809–1905), U.S. federal judge 
George Bryan (politician, died 1843), Irish Member of Parliament in the British House of Commons
George Leopold Bryan (1828–1880), Irish Member of Parliament in the British House of Commons
George D. Bryan (1845–1919), mayor of Charleston, South Carolina, United States
George H. Bryan (1864–1928), British mathematician and aerospace engineer
George Bryan (British businessman) (1921–2013), British founder and owner of Drayton Manor Theme Park
George W. Bryan (born 1946), American CEO of Sara Lee Foods, Senior Vice President of Sara Lee Corporation, and founder of Old Waverly Golf Club
George Bryan (curler), Scottish curler